The Scarborough Beckett Cricket League, founded in 1958, is a Saturday League that administer's cricket clubs that participate in its League, Cup and Trophy competitions. The league headquarters is based in Scarborough, North Yorkshire.

The Scarborough Beckett Cricket League format is the result of an amalgamation with the Derwent Valley League in 2016. The league consists of 5 Divisions. The Premier Division contains a maximum of 12 teams, Divisions 1 to 3 hold 10 teams and Division 4 contains the remaining teams. Clubs participating in the league are mainly from eastern North Yorkshire, with some clubs from the northern border region of the East Riding of Yorkshire.
 
Since 2008, the Championship has fluctuated between four clubs, with Staithes Athletic winning 4 and Staxton 4 titles, until the emergence of Filey, achieving a double championship win in 2018 and 2019.

Winners

Performance by season from 2008

References

External links
 Official SCL website
 Official Twitter page

English domestic cricket competitions
Cricket in North Yorkshire
Cricket in the East Riding of Yorkshire
Cricket in Yorkshire
Cricket competitions in Yorkshire
Club cricket